Adamas is a South Korean television series starring Ji Sung, Seo Ji-hye, and Lee Soo-kyung. It aired on tvN from July 27 to September 15, 2022, every Wednesday and Thursday at 22:30 (KST) for 16 episodes. It is also available for streaming on Disney+ in selected regions.

Synopsis
Adamas tells the story of twin brothers (Ji Sung) fighting against evil to unveil the truth behind a murder that happened 22 years ago in order to clear their biological father's charges, who was accused of killing their stepfather after hearing the death penalty date that has been scheduled for their biological father.

Cast

Main
 Ji Sung as Ha Woo-shin / Song Soo-hyun
 Seo Ji-hye as Eun Hye-soo
 Lee Soo-kyung as Kim Seo-hee

Supporting

People around Ha Woo-shin
 Heo Sung-tae as Choi Tae-seong (Chief Choi)
 Lee Geung-young as Kwon Jae-yoo
 Hwang Jung-min as Butler serving as President Kwon
 Seo Hyun-woo as Kwon Hyun-jo
 Lee Si-won as Secretary Yoon
 Shin Hyeon-seung as Lee Dong-rim
 Woo Hyun-joo as Mrs. Oh
 Go Yoon as Park Yo-won
 Choi Chan-ho as Kim Yo-won

People of Team A
 Oh Dae-hwan as Leader of Team A
 Park Hye-eun as Ace Sun
 Lee Ho-cheol as Section Chief Jung
 Jo Dong-in as Chief Lee

Special Investigation Headquarters
 Choi Deok-moon as Kang Hyuk-pil
 Jang Jin-hee as Miss Lee

Others
 Jo Sung-ha as Lee Chang-woo
 Jo Hyun-woo as Song Soon-ho
 Lee Do-yeop as A mysterious man who watches Song Soo-hyun.
 Jo Han-joon as The repairman came to fix Soo-hyun's bathroom.

Special appearances
 Ahn Bo-hyun as Kwon Min-jo
 Ko Kyu-pil as Gong Dae-chul, Head of the Special Division of the Jungam District Attorney's Office.

Original soundtrack

Part 1

Part 2

Part 3

Part 4

Part 5

Part 6

Viewership

References

External links
  
 
 

Korean-language television shows
TVN (South Korean TV channel) television dramas
Television series by Studio Dragon
South Korean fantasy television series
South Korean romance television series
2022 South Korean television series debuts
2022 South Korean television series endings